The Bradwell Bay Wilderness is part of the United States National Wilderness Preservation System, located in the Florida panhandle adjacent to the Apalachicola National Forest. The 24,602 acre (100 km2) wilderness was established on 3 January 1975 by the Eastern Wilderness Act. "Bay" in this case means "a recess of land, partly surrounded by hills," which, in this particular instance, is mostly titi swamp and standing water.  The Sopchoppy River marks the Bradwell Bay's eastern edge.

A section of the Florida Trail, which usually requires wading through swampy terrain, passes through the wilderness.

Flora 
Titi trees, longleaf pines, loblolly pine and wire grass make up much of the swamp.  The wilderness also contains a  old-growth slash pine - swamp black gum swamp.

Fauna 
White-tailed deer, black bears, and alligators are some of the animals that can be seen here.

References

External links 
 Bradwell Bay Wilderness at Wildernet
 Bradwell Bay Wilderness - official site at Apalachicola National Forest

Protected areas of Wakulla County, Florida
Wilderness areas of Florida
Apalachicola National Forest
Swamps of Florida
1975 establishments in Florida
Protected areas established in 1975